Lamont is a town in Grant County, Oklahoma, United States, situated along the Salt Fork Arkansas River. The population was 417 at the 2010 census, a decline of 10.3 percent from the figure of 465 in 2000.

Geography
Lamont is located at  (36.691164, -97.558852).

Demographics

As of the census of 2000, there were 465 people, 189 households, and 120 families residing in the town. There were 236 housing units at an average density of 705.2 per square mile (276.1/km2). The racial makeup of the town was 94.84% White, 2.58% Native American, 0.22% from other races, and 2.37% from two or more races. Hispanic or Latino of any race were 1.72% of the population.

There were 189 households, out of which 30.7% had children under the age of 18 living with them, 51.9% were married couples living together, 8.5% had a female householder with no husband present, and 36.0% were non-families. 32.3% of all households were made up of individuals, and 20.1% had someone living alone who was 65 years of age or older. The average household size was 2.46 and the average family size was 3.09.

In the town, the population was spread out, with 28.6% under the age of 18, 9.5% from 18 to 24, 22.2% from 25 to 44, 20.9% from 45 to 64, and 18.9% who were 65 years of age or older. The median age was 38 years. For every 100 females, there were 92.9 males. For every 100 females age 18 and over, there were 93.0 males.

The median income for a household in the town was $21,917, and the median income for a family was $26,250. Males had a median income of $37,500 versus $14,107 for females. The per capita income for the town was $11,466. About 16.7% of families and 19.4% of the population were below the poverty line, including 30.5% of those under age 18 and 12.3% of those age 65 or over.

References

Towns in Grant County, Oklahoma
Towns in Oklahoma